Naveet Rathi Singh is a male international Indian lawn bowler.

Bowls career

World Championships
He competed for India at the 2016 World Outdoor Bowls Championship in New Zealand. In 2020 he was selected for the 2020 World Outdoor Bowls Championship in Australia.

Asia Pacific
Rathi won a triples bronze medal at the 2019 Asia Pacific Bowls Championships in the Gold Coast, Queensland.

References

Living people
Indian sportspeople
Indian bowls players
Year of birth missing (living people)